Colonel Reginald Strelley Moresby White CBE was the 10th Commander of the Ceylon Defence Force. He was appointed on 6 February 1939 until 1 January 1942. He was succeeded by T. G. Watson.

First-class cricket
While studying at the University of Oxford, White played first-class cricket for Oxford University, making his debut against Sussex at Hove in 1913. He played first-class cricket for Oxford University in 1913 and 1914, making five appearances. He later played first-class matches for the Europeans in 1924, and the British Army cricket team in 1930. He also played one minor counties cricket match for Lincolnshire in 1913.

References

People from Grantham
Alumni of Brasenose College, Oxford
English cricketers
Oxford University cricketers
Lincolnshire cricketers
Europeans cricketers
British Army cricketers
Commanders of the Ceylon Defence Force
Royal Leicestershire Regiment officers
Commanders of the Order of the British Empire